Jean-Claude Sawyer (born August 12, 1986) is a Canadian former professional ice hockey player who last played for the Cincinnati Cyclones in the ECHL.  He was selected by the Minnesota Wild in the 5th round (161st overall) of the 2004 NHL Entry Draft.

On July 2, 2007, he was signed as a free agent by the Chicago Blackhawks.

Awards and honours
ECHL Defenseman of the Year (2009–10)
ECHL First All-Star Team (2009–10)

Career statistics

References

External links

1986 births
Living people
Cape Breton Screaming Eagles players
Cincinnati Cyclones (ECHL) players
Fresno Falcons players
Gwinnett Gladiators players
Ice hockey people from New Brunswick
Minnesota Wild draft picks
Pensacola Ice Pilots players
Rockford IceHogs (AHL) players
Sportspeople from Saint John, New Brunswick
Toledo Walleye players
Canadian ice hockey defencemen